Aquatica hydrophila is a species of firefly found in Taiwan. Described in 2003, it was formerly placed in the genus Luciola. The larvae are aquatic and live in ditches and small streams.

Taxonomy
Jeng, Lai and Yang described this species as Luciola hydrophila in 2003. The type locality is Wulai, New Taipei, Taiwan, and the holotype is in the National Museum of Natural Science. In 2010, Fu, Ballantyne and Lambkin transferred it to the new genus Aquatica.

Description
It is covered with golden hairs. The prothorax and scutellum are pale yellow, and the elytra are dark brown. The ventrites are dark yellow to brown. The eyes are larger in the male. They have gills, and they have glands that can be turned inside out and secrete protective substances.

Distribution and habitat
A. hydrophila is found in Taiwan, below  in elevation. It is more common in the northern and central parts of the island. Adults are mainly found from March to July. Larvae occur in ditches and small streams with fast-flowing, shallow water and cobbles at the bottom.

Behaviour
The larvae are aquatic. They are unable to swim; they crawl at the bottom of water. The larvae prey on freshwater snails such as Semisulcospira libertina and Thiara tuberculata. The adults produce green-yellow light and have been seen looking for mates near water. Artificial lights can attract males. There is probably one generation per year.

References

Lampyridae
Bioluminescent insects
Beetles of Asia
Insects of Taiwan
Endemic fauna of Taiwan
Beetles described in 2003